Classical Chinese, also known as Literary Chinese (古文 gǔwén "ancient text", or 文言 wényán "text speak", meaning 
"literary language/speech"; modern vernacular: 文言文 wényánwén "text speak text", meaning 
"literary language writing"), is the language of the classic literature from the end of the Spring and Autumn period through to the either the start of the Qin dynasty or the end of the Han dynasty, a written form of Old Chinese (上古漢語, Shànggǔ Hànyǔ). Classical Chinese is a traditional style of written Chinese that evolved from the classical language, making it different from any modern spoken form of Chinese. Literary Chinese was used for almost all formal writing in China until the early 20th century, and also, during various periods, in Japan, Ryukyu, Korea and Vietnam. Among Chinese speakers, Literary Chinese has been largely replaced by written vernacular Chinese, a style of writing that is similar to modern spoken Mandarin Chinese, while speakers of non-Chinese languages have largely abandoned Literary Chinese in favor of their respective local vernaculars. Although languages have evolved in unique, different directions from the base of Literary Chinese, many cognates can be still found between these languages that have historically written in Classical Chinese.

Definitions 
Classical Chinese refers to the written language of the classical period of Chinese literature, from the end of the Spring and Autumn period (early 5th century BC) to the end of the Han dynasty (AD 220), while Literary Chinese is the form of written Chinese used from the end of the Han dynasty to the early 20th century, when it was replaced by vernacular written Chinese. There is also a stricter definition for the Classical period, ranging from Confucius (551–479 BCE) to the foundation of the Qin dynasty.

Literary Chinese is often also referred to as "Classical Chinese", but sinologists generally distinguish it from the language of the early period. During this period, the dialects of China became more and more disparate and thus the Classical written language became less and less representative of the varieties of Chinese (cf. Classical Latin, which was contemporary to the Han Dynasty, and the Romance languages of Europe). Although authors sought to write in the style of the Classics, the similarity decreased over the centuries due to their imperfect understanding of the older language, the influence of their own speech, and the addition of new words.

This situation, the use of Literary Chinese throughout the Chinese cultural sphere despite the existence of disparate regional vernaculars, is called diglossia. It can be compared to the position of Classical Arabic relative to the various regional vernaculars in Arab lands, or of Latin in medieval Europe. The Romance languages continued to evolve, influencing Latin texts of the same period, so that by the Middle Ages, Medieval Latin included many usages that would have been foreign to the Romans. The coexistence of Classical Chinese and the native languages of Japan, Korea and Vietnam can be compared to the use of Classical Latin in nations that natively speak non-Latin-derived Germanic languages or Slavic languages, to the position of Arabic in Persia, or the position of the Indic language Sanskrit in South India and Southeast Asia. However, the non-phonetic Chinese writing system causes a unique situation where the modern pronunciation of the classical language is far more divergent (and heterogeneous, depending on the native – not necessarily Chinese – tongue of the reader) than in analogous cases, complicating understanding and study of Classical Chinese further compared to other classical languages.

Christian missionaries coined the term Wen-li ("the principles of literature", "the book language as opposed to the colloquial") for Literary Chinese. Though composed from Chinese roots, this term was never used in that sense in Chinese, and was rejected by non-missionary sinologues.

Pronunciation 

Chinese characters are not alphabetic and only rarely reflect sound changes. The tentative reconstruction of Old Chinese is an endeavor only a few centuries old. As a result, Classical Chinese is not read with a reconstruction of Old Chinese pronunciation; instead, it is always read with the pronunciations of characters categorized and listed in the Phonology Dictionary (韻書; pinyin: yùnshū, "rhyme book") officially published by the Governments, originally based upon the Middle Chinese pronunciation of Luoyang in the 2nd to 4th centuries. With the progress of time, every dynasty has updated and modified the official Phonology Dictionary. By the time of the Yuan Dynasty and Ming Dynasty, the Phonology Dictionary was based on early Mandarin. But since the Imperial Examination required the composition of Shi genre, in non-Mandarin speaking parts of China such as Zhejiang, Guangdong and Fujian, pronunciation is either based on everyday speech as in Cantonese; or, in some varieties of Chinese (e.g. Southern Min), with a special set of pronunciations used for Classical Chinese or "formal" vocabulary and usage borrowed from Classical Chinese usage. In practice, all varieties of Chinese combine these two extremes. Mandarin and Cantonese, for example, also have words that are pronounced one way in colloquial usage and another way when used in Classical Chinese or in specialized terms coming from Classical Chinese, though the system is not as extensive as that of Southern Min or Wu. (See Literary and colloquial readings of Chinese characters)

Japanese, Korean or Vietnamese readers of Classical Chinese use systems of pronunciation specific to their own languages. For example, Japanese speakers use On'yomi pronunciation when reading the kanji of words of Chinese origin such as 銀行 (ginkō) or the name for the city of Tōkyō (東京), but use Kun'yomi when the kanji represents a native word such as the reading of 行 in 行く (iku) or the reading of both characters in the name for the city of Ōsaka (大阪), and a system that aids Japanese speakers with Classical Chinese word order.

Since the pronunciation of all modern varieties of Chinese is different from Old Chinese or other forms of historical Chinese (such as Middle Chinese), characters that once rhymed in poetry may not rhyme any longer, or vice versa. Poetry and other rhyme-based writing thus becomes less coherent than the original reading must have been. However, some modern Chinese varieties have certain phonological characteristics that are closer to the older pronunciations than others, as shown by the preservation of certain rhyme structures.

Another phenomenon that is common in reading Classical Chinese is homophony (words that sound the same). More than 2,500 years of sound change separates Classical Chinese from any modern variety, so when reading Classical Chinese in any modern variety of Chinese (especially Mandarin) or in Japanese, Korean, or Vietnamese, many characters which originally had different pronunciations have become homonyms. There is a famous Classical Chinese poem written in the early 20th century by the linguist Chao Yuen Ren called the Lion-Eating Poet in the Stone Den, which contains only words that are now pronounced  with various tones in Mandarin. It was written to show how Classical Chinese has become an impractical language for speakers of modern Chinese because Classical Chinese when spoken aloud is largely incomprehensible. However the poem is perfectly comprehensible when read silently because Literary Chinese, by its very nature as a written language using a logographic writing system, can often get away with using homophones that even in spoken Old Chinese would not have been distinguishable in any way.

The situation is analogous to that of some English words that are spelled differently but sound the same, such as "meet" and "meat", which were pronounced  and  respectively during the time of Chaucer, as shown by their spelling. However, such homophones are far more common in Literary Chinese than in English. For example, the following distinct Old Chinese words are now all pronounced yì in Mandarin: *ŋjajs 議 "discuss", *ŋjət 仡 "powerful", *ʔjup 邑 "city", *ʔjək 億 "100,000,000", *ʔjəks 意 "thought", *ʔjek 益 "increase", *ʔjik 抑 "press down", *jak 弈 "Chinese chess",  逸 "flee",  翼 "wing",  易 "change",  易 "easy", and  蜴 "lizard".

Romanizations have been devised giving distinct spellings for the words of Classical Chinese, together with rules for pronunciation in various modern varieties.
The earliest was the Romanisation Interdialectique (1931–2) of French missionaries Henri Lamasse, of the Paris Foreign Missions Society, and Ernest Jasmin, based on Middle Chinese, followed by linguist Wang Li's wényán luómǎzì (1940) based on Old Chinese, and Chao's General Chinese Romanization (1975).
However none of these systems has seen extensive use.

Grammar and lexicon 

Classical Chinese is distinguished from written vernacular Chinese in its style, which appears extremely concise and compact to modern Chinese speakers, and to some extent in the use of different lexical items (vocabulary). An essay in Classical Chinese, for example, might use half as many Chinese characters as in vernacular Chinese to relate the same content.

In terms of conciseness and compactness, Classical Chinese rarely uses words composed of two Chinese characters; nearly all words are of one syllable only. This stands directly in contrast with modern Northern Chinese varieties including Mandarin, in which two-syllable, three-syllable, and four-syllable words are extremely common, whilst although two-syllable words are also quite common within modern Southern Chinese varieties, they are still more archaic in that they use more one-syllable words than Northern Chinese varieties. This phenomenon exists, in part, because polysyllabic words evolved in Chinese to disambiguate homophones that result from sound changes. This is similar to such phenomena in English as the pen–pin merger of many dialects in the American south and the caught-cot merger of most dialects of American English: because the words "pin" and "pen", as well as "caught" and "cot", sound alike in such dialects of English, a certain degree of confusion can occur unless one adds qualifiers like "ink pen" and "stick pin." Similarly, Chinese has acquired many polysyllabic words in order to disambiguate monosyllabic words that sounded different in earlier forms of Chinese but identical in one region or another during later periods. Because Classical Chinese is based on the literary examples of ancient Chinese literature, it has almost none of the two-syllable words present in modern Chinese varieties.

Classical Chinese has more pronouns compared to the modern vernacular. In particular, whereas Mandarin has one general character to refer to the first-person pronoun ("I"/"me"), Literary Chinese has several, many of which are used as part of honorific language (see Chinese honorifics).

In syntax, Classical Chinese is always ready to drop subjects and objects when a reference to them is understood (pragmatically inferable). Also, words are not restrictively categorized into parts of speech: nouns are commonly used as verbs, adjectives as nouns, and so on. There is no copula in Classical Chinese, "是" (pinyin: shì) is a copula in modern Chinese but in old Chinese it was originally a near demonstrative ("this"); the modern Chinese for "this" is "這" (pinyin: zhè).

Beyond grammar and vocabulary differences, Classical Chinese can be distinguished by literary and cultural differences: an effort to maintain parallelism and rhythm, even in prose works, and extensive use of literary and cultural allusions, thereby also contributing to brevity.

Many final particles (歇語字, xiēyǔzì) and interrogative particles are found in Literary Chinese.

Historical use 

Literary Chinese was adopted in Korea, Japan, and Vietnam. The Oxford Handbook of Classical Chinese Literature argues that this adoption came mainly from diplomatic and cultural ties with China, while conquest, colonisation, and migration played smaller roles.

Modern use 

Classical Chinese was the main form used in Chinese literary works until the May Fourth Movement (1919), and was also used extensively in Japan, Korea, and Vietnam. Classical Chinese was used to write the Hunmin Jeongeum proclamation in which the modern Korean alphabet (hangul) was promulgated and the essay by Hu Shih in which he argued against using Classical Chinese and in favor of written vernacular Chinese. (The latter parallels the essay written by Dante in Latin in which he expounded the virtues of the vernacular Italian.) Exceptions to the use of Classical Chinese were vernacular novels such as Dream of the Red Chamber.

Most government documents in the Republic of China (Taiwan) were written in Classical Chinese until reforms in the 1970s, in a reform movement spearheaded by President Yen Chia-kan to shift the written style to vernacular Chinese. However, most of the laws of Taiwan are still written in a subset of Literary Chinese. As a result, it is necessary for modern Taiwanese lawyers to learn this language.

Today, pure Classical Chinese is occasionally used in formal or ceremonial occasions. The National Anthem of the Republic of China, for example, is in Classical Chinese. Buddhist texts, or sutras, are still preserved in Classical Chinese from the time they were composed or translated from Sanskrit sources. In practice there is a socially accepted continuum between vernacular Chinese and Classical Chinese. For example, most official notices and formal letters are written with a number of stock Classical Chinese expressions (e.g. salutation, closing). Personal letters, on the other hand, are mostly written in vernacular, but with some Classical phrases, depending on the subject matter, the writer's level of education, etc. With the exception of professional scholars and enthusiasts, most people today cannot write in full Classical Chinese with ease.

Most Chinese people with at least a middle school education are able to read basic Classical Chinese, because the ability to read (but not write) Classical Chinese is part of the Chinese middle school and high school curricula and is part of the college entrance examination. Classical Chinese is taught primarily by presenting a classical Chinese work and including a vernacular gloss that explains the meaning of phrases. Tests on classical Chinese usually ask the student to express the meaning of a paragraph in vernacular Chinese. They often take the form of comprehension questions.

The contemporary use of Classical Chinese in Japan is mainly in the field of education and the study of literature. Learning the Japanese way (kanbun) of decoding Classical Chinese is part of the high school curriculum in Japan. Japan is the only country that maintains the tradition of creating Classical Chinese poetry based on Tang dynasty's tone patterns.

The use of Classical Chinese in these regions is limited and is mainly in the field of Classical studies.

In addition, many works of literature in Classical Chinese (such as Tang poetry) have been major cultural influences. However, even with knowledge of grammar and vocabulary, Classical Chinese can be difficult to understand by native speakers of modern Chinese, because of its heavy use of literary references and allusions as well as its extremely abbreviated style.

See also 

Classical Chinese grammar
Classical Chinese lexicon
Classical Chinese poetry
Classical Chinese writers
Adoption of Chinese literary culture
Kanbun
Gugyeol
Literary Chinese literature in Korea
Literary Chinese in Vietnam
Sino-Xenic vocabulary
Sino-Japanese vocabulary
Sino-Korean vocabulary
Sino-Vietnamese vocabulary

Notes

References

Citations

Sources

External links

 Classical Chinese for Everyone, Bryan Van Norden, 2004
 Chinese Notes: Introduction to Classical Chinese, Alex Amies, 2013
 Chinese Texts: A Classical Chinese course, Mark Edward Lewis, 2014
  Literary Chinese, Robert Eno, 2012-2013 (to access the book use provided PDF index file)
 A Primer in Chinese Buddhist Writings, John Kieschnick, 2015
Classical Chinese Lexicon, John Cikoski, 2011. 
Microsoft Translator releases literary Chinese translation (Microsoft Translator Blog, August 25, 2021)

 
Chinese language
Chinese
Korean language
Japanese language
Vietnamese writing systems